George Davies (19 March 1892 – 27 November 1957) was an Australian cricketer. He played five first-class cricket matches for Victoria between 1921 and 1932.

See also
 List of Victoria first-class cricketers

References

External links
 

1892 births
1957 deaths
Australian cricketers
Victoria cricketers
Cricketers from Victoria (Australia)